Lithium orthosilicate is a compound with the chemical formula Li4SiO4.

Lithium orthosilicate is of primary interest towards carbon dioxide capture, as this compound reacts with CO2 at elevated temperatures to form lithium carbonate, and has been implemented in limited scale in such applications. 
Further applications of Li4SiO4 include solid electrolytes for lithium-ion batteries, specifically solid state batteries, and tritium breeding materials, as a component of the breeding blanket for planned fusion energy systems such as ITER.

See also
Carbon dioxide scrubber

References

Silicates
Lithium compounds